The Watcher is a 2000 American thriller film directed by Joe Charbanic and starring James Spader, Marisa Tomei, and Keanu Reeves. Set in Chicago, the film is about a retired FBI agent who is stalked and taunted by a serial killer.

Plot
In Los Angeles, FBI Special Agent Joel Campbell is moments too late to save a young woman from a serial killer he has been investigating, who escapes. Campbell quits his job and moves to Chicago, where he is plagued by guilt-induced migraines. Campbell attends therapy sessions with Dr. Polly Beilman, but otherwise has no friends or social life.

Campbell learns that a woman who lived in his apartment building has been murdered. He does not pay it much attention until he opens his mail and finds that a picture of the woman had been sent to his apartment three days before the murder. He brings this information to the attention of the detective on the case, Det. Mackie, and comes to the conclusion that the same serial killer has arrived in Chicago. FBI Special Agent in Charge Ibby tries to persuade Campbell to return to the case, but he refuses.

One night Campbell receives a phone call from the killer, David Allen Griffin, who reveals that he followed Campbell to Chicago and wants to rebuild the "rapport" they once had. Griffin tells Campbell that he will send a photo of a woman in the morning and that Campbell has until 9:00 pm that night to find her. Campbell tells Ibby that he wants back in on the case, and his request is granted.

Campbell works together with Mackie and the rest of the team in getting the word out on finding the woman before the deadline. However, by the time Campbell gets her house number and calls, Griffin is already there, and has killed her. Griffin suggests that they continue their "game" with a different woman. The next day, Campbell and his team try to find the next intended victim before the 9:00 pm deadline. They corner and almost catch Griffin, but he manages to once again kill the woman and escape. Later that night, Campbell is found unconscious in his apartment by his colleagues.

The next day, another photo arrives, but it turns out to be the image of Lisa Anton, Campbell's former lover who was killed by Griffin back in Los Angeles. Campbell goes to Lisa's grave, where Griffin is waiting for him. Griffin explains that he has Beilman hostage somewhere, and only wants to talk with him. Campbell negotiates for Beilman's safety, and Griffin eventually agrees to bring Campbell to see her. During the drive, Griffin explains that he considers Campbell a "good friend", and that the two of them need each other. Campbell secretly uses his cell phone to call Mackie, cluing him in on the situation. Griffin takes Campbell to the warehouse, knocks him out, and restrains him while he starts to strangle Beilman. Campbell distracts Griffin by saying 'thank you'. When Griffin asks Campbell to repeat himself, Campbell does, and proceeds to stab him in the neck with a pen before shooting him in the shoulder with a double-barrelled shotgun. Campbell rescues Beilman and gets them both to safety as the warehouse explodes, killing Griffin.

When Campbell and Beilman are safe, Campbell goes over to Griffin's charred corpse and looks at it to make sure he is dead.

Cast
 James Spader as FBI Special Agent Joel Campbell
 Marisa Tomei as Dr. Polly Beilman
 Keanu Reeves as David Allen Griffin
 Ernie Hudson as FBI Special Agent In Charge Mike Ibby
 Chris Ellis as Detective Hollis Mackie
 Robert Cicchini as FBI Special Agent Mitch Casper
 Jenny McShane as FBI Agent Diana
 Gina Alexander as FBI Agent Sharon
 Andrew Rothenberg as FBI Agent Jack Fray
 David Pasquesi as FBI Agent Norton
 Michael Guido as FBI Agent Mendel
 Mindy Bell as Supervising Agent
 Yvonne Niami as Lisa Marie Anton
 Rebekah Louise Smith as Ellie Buckner, Third Chicago Victim
 Jillian Peterson as Jessica, Fourth Chicago Victim
 Michele DiMaso as Rachel, Jessica's Mother
 Joseph Sikora as Skater
 Butch Jerinic as Flower Girl
 Jason Wells as Computer Tech
 Tamara Tungate as Young Woman
 Erikka Yancy as Campbell's Secretary
 Marilyn Dodds Frank as Wanda
 Shela Coleman as Wanda's Sister
 Kyle Hillman as FBI Agent (uncredited)
 Scott A. Martin as FBI Agent (uncredited)
 Eriq F. Prince as FBI Agent (uncredited)
 Jimmy Star as FBI Agent (uncredited)
 Terrence Smith-Purdis as Paramedic (Uncredited)

Production
Reeves has stated that he was not interested in the script but was forced into doing the film when his friend, the film's director Joe Charbanic, forged his signature on a contract. He performed the role rather than get involved in a lengthy legal battle. Reeves reached an agreement with distributor Universal Pictures in which he would not disclose what had happened until 12 months after the film's US release; in return, Universal agreed to downplay Reeves's involvement in marketing, and Universal asked the film's producers to enhance Reeves's profit participation (which led Reeves to ultimately receive an additional $2 million).  He was unhappy with the fact that his role, which was originally written as little more than a cameo, turned into a lead while he was still being paid scale in contrast to the other leads. The Watcher (originally known as Driven before a film of that same name was announced) was filmed between October and December 1999 on location in Chicago, Illinois and Oak Park, Illinois.

This movie featured the 1996 hit "6 Underground" performed by Sneaker Pimps.

Reception
The film was critically panned with Rotten Tomatoes holding an 11% Tomatometer based on 90 reviews, with an average rating of 3.5/10. Metacritic, which uses a weighted average, assigned a score of 22 out of 100 based on 29 critics, indicating "generally unfavorable reviews". Audiences polled by CinemaScore gave the film an average grade of "C-" on an A+ to F scale. Keanu Reeves earned a Razzie Award nomination as Worst Supporting Actor for his performance, "losing" the award to Barry Pepper for Battlefield Earth.

Box office
The film opened at the top spot of the North American box office making $9,062,295 USD in its opening weekend. The September 15–17, 2000 weekend had one of the worst box offices since the 1980s. It had a 36% decline in gross earnings the following week but that was enough to keep the film at the top spot. Its total domestic gross was $28,946,615.

References

External links
 
 

2000 films
2000 horror films
2000 crime thriller films
2000 psychological thriller films
Films set in Chicago
Films shot in Chicago
American crime thriller films
American psychological horror films
American serial killer films
2000s serial killer films
Universal Pictures films
Films scored by Marco Beltrami
Films about the Federal Bureau of Investigation
2000s English-language films
2000s American films